John Henderson (1860-1924) was a Scottish  Glaswegian landscape and portrait painter and Director of Glasgow School of Art

Family

John Henderson was the brother of the painter Joseph Morris Henderson RSA (1863-1936) and the son of the Scottish Glaswegian painter Joseph Henderson RSW (1832-1908). His sister, Marjory Henderson married the well known Scottish painter William McTaggart.

Biography

Henderson was born in Glasgow and studied firstly at the Glasgow School of Art under Robert Greenlees and then obtained a MA at the University of Glasgow. He was a portrait and landscape painter. He exhibited in 1884 firstly at the Royal Glasgow Institute of the Fine Arts, where he became a member of the Council. He exhibited until 1924 at the Royal Glasgow Institute, at the Royal Scottish Academy, and the Royal Scottish Society of Painters in Watercolour. In Liverpool he exhibited at the Walker Art Gallery and in Manchester at the City Art Gallery.

He also assisted at the Glasgow International Exhibitions of 1901–1911 and served as a Governor of the Glasgow School of Art from 1906 to 1918. He then was appointed in 1918 a Director of the Glasgow School of Art having been acting as a director since 1914. He remained there until 1924. The School of Art and the Glasgow University strengthened their links under his leadership developing an Architectural Degree in 1924 which gave the School a teaching institutional status. He suddenly died in Busby, East Renfrewshire near Glasgow in 1924. During his working time at the Glasgow School of Art he painted a portrait of Andrew Fergus (1827-1887) MD MRCS, which hangs in the University of Strathclyde.

References

 Johnson, J., and Anna Greutzner, Dictionary of British Artists 1880-1940, Woodbridge, 1980.
 Hilary Christie-Johnson, 2013. " Joseph Henderson : Doyen of Glasgow Artists 1832-1908"

External links
 
http://www.whistler.arts.gla.ac.uk/correspondence/people/biog/?bid=Hend_Jo&initial=H
http://www.gashe.ac.uk:443/isaar/P0175.html

1860 births
1924 deaths
19th-century Scottish painters
Scottish male painters
20th-century Scottish painters
British Impressionist painters
Scottish landscape painters
Directors of the Glasgow School of Art
19th-century Scottish male artists
20th-century Scottish male artists